Convoy HX 231 was the 231st of the numbered series of World War II HX convoys of merchant ships from HalifaX to Liverpool. The ships departed New York City on 25 March 1943 and were met on 31 March by Mid-Ocean Escort Force Group B-7. The convoy was found on 4 April and attacked by eleven U-boats of the 1st, 3rd, 6th and 10th U-boat flotillas, operating out of Brest, La Rochelle, St Nazaire and Lorient, respectively. These U-boats formed the wolfpack Löwenherz (Lionheart). The U-boats sank six ships before losing contact on 7 April. Two U-boats, U-632 and U-635, were sunk. Surviving ships from the convoy reached Liverpool on 10 April.

Ships in the convoy

References

Bibliography

External links

HX231
Naval battles of World War II involving Canada